Fridtjof Island is an island lying  northeast of Vázquez Island, off the southeast side of Wiencke Island in the Palmer Archipelago. It was discovered and named by the Belgian Antarctic Expedition under Gerlache, 1897–99. It is among several islands charted and named by this expedition in 1898, before their ship crossed the Antarctic Circle on 15 February.

See also 
 List of Antarctic and sub-Antarctic islands

References

Islands of the Palmer Archipelago